This is a list of singles that charted in the top ten of the ARIA Charts in 2020. In 2020, thirty-three acts reached the top ten for the first time.

Top-ten singles

Key

2018 peaks

2019 peaks

2021 peaks 

Notes:
The singles re-entered the top 10 on 6 January 2020.
The single re-entered the top 10 on 20 January 2020.
The single re-entered the top 10 on 27 January 2020.
The single re-entered the top 10 on 3 February 2020.
The single re-entered the top 10 on 10 February 2020.
The single re-entered the top 10 on 17 February 2020.
The single re-entered the top 10 on 24 February 2020.
The single re-entered the top 10 on 2 March 2020.
The single re-entered the top 10 on 16 March 2020.
The single re-entered the top 10 on 27 April 2020.
The single re-entered the top 10 on 18 May 2020.
The single re-entered the top 10 on 15 June 2020.
The single re-entered the top 10 on 27 July 2020.
The single re-entered the top 10 on 10 August 2020.
The single re-entered the top 10 on 7 September 2020.
The single re-entered the top 10 on 21 September 2020.
The single re-entered the top 10 on 5 October 2020.
The single re-entered the top 10 on 14 December 2020.
The single re-entered the top 10 on 28 December 2020.
The single re-entered the top 10 on 4 January 2021.
The single re-entered the top 10 on 25 January 2021.
The single re-entered the top 10 on 15 February 2021.

Notes

Entries by artist
The following table shows artists who achieved two or more top 10 entries in 2020, including songs that reached their peak in 2019. The figures include both main artists and featured artists.

See also
 2020 in music
 ARIA Charts
 List of number-one singles of 2020 (Australia)
 List of top 10 albums in 2020 (Australia)

References

Australia Singles Top 10
Top 10 singles
Top 10 singles 2020
Australia 2020